Jon Bass (born September 22, 1989) is an American actor, known for his roles in She-Hulk: Attorney at Law, Super Pumped, Baywatch, and the comedy series Big Time in Hollywood, FL.

Early life and education
Bass grew up in Bellaire, Texas, and attended Bellaire High School, graduating in 2005. He graduated from Boston University in 2011 with a Bachelor of Fine Arts degree in Theatre Arts. He is Jewish.

Career
Following college, he moved to New York City and began his professional acting career. Bass auditioned for the role of Elder Cunningham in the Broadway musical The Book of Mormon, but was not cast. A year later, he was cast in the role in the Denver and Los Angeles productions and went on to replace Josh Gad in the role on Broadway.

In 2014, he played a small role in the HBO comedy series Girls, and then had minor guest roles in The Newsroom and House of Lies. Later in 2015, he was cast in a lead role in the Comedy Central's series Big Time in Hollywood, FL, portraying Del Plimpton.

In 2016, he played real-life attorney Philip Hirschkop in the historical film Loving. In 2017, he appeared in the film All Nighter,. He played the role of C.J. Parker's significant other, Ronnie Greenbaum in the action comedy film Baywatch, along with Zac Efron and Dwayne Johnson, and appeared in Molly's Game, directed by Aaron Sorkin.

Bass portrays a fictionalized version of Uber cofounder Garrett Camp opposite Joseph Gordon-Levitt in the drama series Super Pumped which premiered in 2022. The book is based on Mike Isaac's 2019 book of the same name.

Since 2022, he has portrayed Todd Phelps in the Disney+ series She-Hulk: Attorney at Law.

Filmography

Film

Television

References

External links
 

American male film actors
American male television actors
American male stage actors
American male comedians
21st-century American comedians
Bellaire High School (Bellaire, Texas) alumni
Boston University College of Fine Arts alumni
Jewish American male actors
Living people
People from Bellaire, Texas
1989 births
21st-century American Jews